The Jones Falls is a  stream in Maryland.  It is impounded to create Lake Roland before running through the city of Baltimore and finally emptying into the Baltimore Inner Harbor.

The Jones Falls valley has a long history in the city of Baltimore as a transportation corridor.  The valley of the Jones Falls carries Falls Road (which is numbered as Maryland Route 25), the tracks for the Amtrak Northeast Corridor, the Jones Falls Expressway (JFX) of Interstate 83, and the Baltimore Light Rail.  The Baltimore Penn Station also rests on an elevated platform in the valley.  It also carries tracks for a historic rail line which is currently served by the Baltimore Streetcar Museum.  The MTA Maryland Route 27 also provides transportation on Falls Road; however, at some point it was moved from following 36th Street south to other city streets.

The Jones Falls is spanned by many bridges within Baltimore City's borders, and often the Jones Falls Expressway rests directly above the river.

Course
The Jones Falls begins as a small stream in Baltimore County near Garrison at the intersection of Caves and Garrison Road (39.41771° -76.75750°). It travels southeast for  before joining the North Branch Jones Falls stream near Stevenson (39.41225° -76.70937°). North Branch Jones Falls originates near Worthington by the intersection of Park Heights Avenue and Walnut Avenue (39.46135° -76.75057°). The North Branch travels south for  before joining Jones Falls stream. The falls then travels east for  before Dipping Pond Run joins at ( 39.41424° -76.68557°). The Jones Falls continues east another  before Deep Run intersects near Brooklandville (39.41467° -76.67060°). The stream then continues south along Interstate 83 (I-83), which is named the Jones Falls Expressway, for  until Slaughterhouse Branch and Moores Branch join it next to the I-83 overpass over Maryland Route 25 (MD 25, Falls Road) (39.39587° -76.66442°). (39.39069° -76.64639°)  In Lake Roland, Roland Run and Towson Run both join. Once it leaves Lake Roland, the Jones Falls becomes a small river.

Not long after leaving the lake, the Jones Falls enters Baltimore directly underneath an intersection of Interstate 83 and the Baltimore Light Rail's mainline, with both routes beginning to parallel I-83.  For the remainder of the Jones Falls' course, I-83 enters the Jones Falls valley, where it constantly crosses over, parallels, and covers the river.  Another  after entering the city, Western Run joins near Mount Washington (39.36717° -76.64835°). The Jones Falls, I-83, and the Light Rail continue south for  before the last major stream, Stony Run, empties into the stream near Druid Hill Park (39.31683° -76.62672°).  Along the way, MD 25 enters the valley, running parallel to the river opposite of the highway and rail lines.  MD 25 is also paralleled by the Jones Falls Trail.  About a  before it intersects Stony Run, the Jones Falls goes over a  waterfall named "Round Falls".

About  after Stony Run, and after passing by the Baltimore Streetcar Museum, the CSXT-operated Baltimore Belt Line bridges the river, bound for the Howard Street Tunnel.  The Jones Falls then immediately passes underneath North Avenue.  Just south of North Avenue, the Amtrak Northeast Corridor enters the valley upon exiting the Baltimore and Potomac Tunnel and bridging the Jones Falls, with Howard Street Bridge directly above this intersection.  MD 25 ends shortly after (splitting into the one-way couplet of eastbound Lanvale Street and westbound Lafayette Avenue), with the Jones Falls Trail joining city streets, and the Light Rail also leaves the valley to join Howard Street.  After the rapid succession of bridges, the Jones Falls almost immediately enters a tunnel, the Jones Falls Conduit, which curves to flow directly underneath I-83 (39.30896° -76.61964°).  After passing by Baltimore's Pennsylvania Station, situated directly in the valley, the Northeast Corridor exits the valley, and the Jones Falls Conduit and I-83 curve sharply to the south.  The river and highway continue to Fayette Street.  Here, I-83 ends; two block south of this point, the Jones Falls exits the conduit and flows several more blocks before it empties into the east side of the Inner Harbor (39.28657° -76.60457°) near Mr. Trash Wheel.

Future
As far back as 1990, city-sponsored planning studies showed support for the idea of partially demolishing I-83 and thus daylighting the Jones Falls. More recent suggestions include a long-range plan proposed by Marc Szarkowski, while he was working for the Philadelphia firm Dremodeling, and a more immediate and concrete plan commissioned by the city from Baltimore-based Rummel, Klepper & Kahl in 2009.

The Szarkowski vision is wide ranging, including infill housing, an expansion of Penn Station, a system of roundabouts, a multi-story sculpture and several new, buried transit lines. Szarkowski has publicly acknowledged the extremely ambitious and long-range nature of the plan.

The RK&K study was more limited, assessing only the area from Fayette Street to Chase Street. The long-range Szarkowski concept includes selected portions of the watershed from as far north as Woodberry, though with significantly less engineering detail included.

See also
 List of rivers in Maryland

References

External links

 The Jones Falls Watershed Association
 Article from the Johns Hopkins Newsletter

Landforms of Baltimore
Patapsco River
Rivers of Maryland
Subterranean rivers of the United States